Ludwig Fischer (16 April 1905 – 8 March 1947) was a German Nazi Party lawyer, politician and a convicted war criminal who was executed for war crimes.

Background 
Born into a Catholic family in Kaiserslautern, Fischer joined the Nazi Party in 1926 while a student, and the Sturmabteilung (SA) in 1929, eventually rising to the rank of Gruppenführer. In 1937, he was elected to the Reichstag.

Actions during the Nazi occupation of Poland 

Germany  invaded Poland in September 1939. On 24 October 1939 Fischer became Chief Administrator (and in 1941 Governor) of the Warsaw District in the occupied General Government (the area of Poland that Germany did not formally annex). He held this position until the withdrawal of the German forces from Warsaw in January 1945.

Fischer was directly responsible for a number of war crimes, as well as crimes against humanity. He oversaw the establishment of the Warsaw Ghetto and issued many anti-Semitic laws, as well as participating in the bloody Ghetto de-establishment and deportation. Fischer was also responsible for terror in the occupied city, including mass executions,  slave-labor  and the deportation of Poles and Polish Jews to the various  German concentration camps. The Underground courts of the Polish resistance movement sentenced him to death for crimes against Polish citizens. His name appeared first on the list of "Operation Heads"—the serial assassinations of Nazi personnel by the Polish Resistance. Before the Warsaw Uprising in 1944, his car was shot at in Operation Hunting, but Fischer survived.

After the failure of the Warsaw Uprising of August to October 1944, Fischer played an important role in Germany's planned destruction of Warsaw. He was also responsible for the poor conditions in the temporary transit camp on the western outskirts of Warsaw in Pruszków, which the Nazis set up to intern people expelled from the capital.

Postwar trial and execution 
After the war, Fischer hid in the town of Bad Neustadt an der Saale in Bavaria. He was arrested by U.S. soldiers on 10 May 1945. On 30 March 1946, Fischer was extradited to Poland, where he was put on  trial for crimes against humanity. On 3 March 1947, Fischer was sentenced to death by hanging and was handed over to the Polish authorities. He was tried before the Supreme National Tribunal and sentenced to death. Treblinka and Warsaw uprising survivor Jankiel Wiernik testified at his trial in 1947. Fischer was executed by hanging in Warsaw's Mokotów Prison.

References

Further reading

 Joseph Wulf, Das Dritte Reich und seine Vollstrecker, Frankfurt/Main 1984
 Ernst Klee, Das Personenlexikon zum Dritten Reich, Frankfurt/Main 2003

External links 
 Testimonies collected during Fischer's trial in "Chronicles of Terror" database

1905 births
1947 deaths
People from Kaiserslautern
German people convicted of crimes against humanity
Executed people from Rhineland-Palatinate
Holocaust perpetrators in Poland
Sturmabteilung officers
Members of the Reichstag of Nazi Germany
Executed German people
Executions by the Supreme National Tribunal
Prisoners and detainees of the United States military
People extradited to Poland
Executed mass murderers